The meridian 127° east of Greenwich is a line of longitude that extends from the North Pole across the Arctic Ocean, Asia, Australia, the Indian Ocean, the Southern Ocean, and Antarctica to the South Pole.

The 127th meridian east forms a great circle with the 53rd meridian west.

From Pole to Pole
Starting at the North Pole and heading south to the South Pole, the 127th meridian east passes through:

{| class="wikitable plainrowheaders"
! scope="col" width="130" | Co-ordinates
! scope="col" | Country, territory or sea
! scope="col" | Notes
|-
| style="background:#b0e0e6;" | 
! scope="row" style="background:#b0e0e6;" | Arctic Ocean
| style="background:#b0e0e6;" |
|-
| style="background:#b0e0e6;" | 
! scope="row" style="background:#b0e0e6;" | Laptev Sea
| style="background:#b0e0e6;" |
|-valign="top"
| 
! scope="row" | 
| Sakha Republic — islands of the Lena Delta and the mainland Amur Oblast — from 
|-valign="top"
| 
! scope="row" | 
| Heilongjiang Jilin — from  Heilongjiang — for about 10 km from  Jilin — from 
|-
| 
! scope="row" | 
|Jagang ProvinceYanggang ProvinceSouth Hamgyeong ProvinceSouth Pyeongan ProvinceSouth Hamgyeong ProvinceGangwon Province
|-
| 
! scope="row" | 
|
Gyeonggi Province Passing through Seoul  Gyeonggi Province - Passing through of Suwon  South Chungcheong Province  North Jeolla Province - Passing just west of Jeonju  South Jeolla Province  Passing just east of Gwangju  South Jeolla Province
|-valign="top"
| style="background:#b0e0e6;" | 
! scope="row" style="background:#b0e0e6;" | East China Sea
| style="background:#b0e0e6;" | Passing just east of the island of Jeju-do,  (at ) Passing just west of the island of Tonakijima, Okinawa Prefecture,  (at ) Passing just east of the island of Kumejima, Okinawa Prefecture,  (at )
|-valign="top"
| style="background:#b0e0e6;" | 
! scope="row" style="background:#b0e0e6;" | Pacific Ocean
| style="background:#b0e0e6;" | Philippine Sea — passing just east of the Talaud Islands,  (at )
|-valign="top"
| style="background:#b0e0e6;" | 
! scope="row" style="background:#b0e0e6;" | Molucca Sea
| style="background:#b0e0e6;" | Passing just west of the island of Latalata,  (at ) Passing just west of the island of Kasiruta,  (at )
|-
| style="background:#b0e0e6;" | 
! scope="row" style="background:#b0e0e6;" | Ceram Sea
| style="background:#b0e0e6;" |
|-
| 
! scope="row" | 
| Island of Buru
|-valign="top"
| style="background:#b0e0e6;" | 
! scope="row" style="background:#b0e0e6;" | Banda Sea
| style="background:#b0e0e6;" | Passing just east of the island of Wetar,  (at ) Passing just west of the island of Kisar,  (at )
|-
| 
! scope="row" | 
|
|-
| style="background:#b0e0e6;" | 
! scope="row" style="background:#b0e0e6;" | Timor Sea
| style="background:#b0e0e6;" |
|-
| 
! scope="row" | 
| Western Australia
|-
| style="background:#b0e0e6;" | 
! scope="row" style="background:#b0e0e6;" | Indian Ocean
| style="background:#b0e0e6;" | Australian authorities consider this to be part of the Southern Ocean
|-
| style="background:#b0e0e6;" | 
! scope="row" style="background:#b0e0e6;" | Southern Ocean
| style="background:#b0e0e6;" |
|-
| 
! scope="row" | Antarctica
| Australian Antarctic Territory, claimed by 
|-
|}

See also
126th meridian east
128th meridian east

References

e127 meridian east